Trevor Fancutt (14 July 1934 – 23 December 2022) was a South African tennis player.

In 1960 Fancutt, partnering Jan Lehane, won the mixed doubles title of the Australian Championships, defeating Christine Truman and Martin Mulligan in straight sets. 
 
In 1957, he played in two ties for the South African Davis Cup team and compiled a match record of two wins and two losses. 

In August 1957, he beat Alex Olmedo in the final of the international tournament in Kitzbühel, Austria in three straight sets.

Fancutt married Australian singles semi finalist Daphne Seeney. Two of their sons, Charlie Fancutt and Michael Fancutt, were professional tennis players who played on the main tour (a third son Chris Fancutt played at challenger level).

Fancutt died on 23 December 2022, at the age of 88.

Grand Slam finals

Mixed doubles (1 title)

References

External links

 
 
 

1934 births
2022 deaths
South African emigrants to Australia
South African male tennis players
Australian Championships (tennis) champions
Grand Slam (tennis) champions in mixed doubles
People from Kokstad